Bykea, stylized as BYKEA, is a Pakistani ride hailing service and parcel delivery company based in Karachi, Pakistan. It was founded by Muneeb Maayr in 2016.

It competes with Careem Bike and Uber Moto in the region.

History
Bykea was started in December 2016 from Karachi, Pakistan. The company currently operates in three Pakistani cities Karachi, Lahore & Rawalpindi.

In 2018, Bykea  partnered with  Jazz, a Pakistan-based digital communications company  to provide enhanced digital connectivity and efficiency to users. In 2018, Bykea , MJSF (Mahvash and Jahangir Siddiqui Foundation) & Malik Group of Companies (Headed by Mr Ali Malik) joined hands for Bikers Support Scheme.

In 2019, Bykea raised $5.7 million in series A funding from local and international institutions.

In the midst of the COVID-19 pandemic in Pakistan, Bykea had secured a $13 million investment but due to the government's ban on pillion riding to combat the virus, investors reneged on the deal.

Services
Bykea enables a crowdsourced network of motorbike owners to transport people, parcels, on-demand shopping and payments within a city.

See also
 Platform economy
 Vehicle for hire
 Motorcycling
 Transport
 List of gig economy companies

References

Companies based in Karachi
Logistics companies of Pakistan
Pakistani companies established in 2016
Transport companies established in 2016
Ridesharing companies